Anasibirites is an extinct genus of cephalopod belonging to the Ammonite subclass.

References 

Ammonite genera